Bellavista is a neighbourhood in the Bellavista-La Palmera district in the south of the city of Seville, Andalusia, Spain. It lies on the east bank of the Guadaira river, a tributary of the Guadalquivir. Bellavista once belonged to the town of Dos Hermanas, but were sold to the city of Seville.  Bellavista, which means Beautiful View in Spanish, is thus the southernmost neighbourhood in Seville, and quite separated from the rest of the city.

Bellavista was once called Barrio de la Salud, before belonging to Seville proper.  It has between 15,000 and 20,000 inhabitants, thus making it a sizeable neighbourhood by population.  Although there are many housing complexes dating from recent years and decades, they are built around a historical core.

The neighbourhood is almost entirely a commuter community, and it was just in the Spring of 2007 that Seville's TUSSAM municipal bus routes incorporated stops in Bellavista into the city's bus routes. The N-IV road leads north from Bellavista into Seville as the Avenida de Jerez, and south to Dos Hermanas as the Avenida de Bellavista.

Bellavista is the birthplace of Felipe González, the first socialist Prime Minister after the restoration of democracy in Spain.

Neighbourhoods of Seville